The Christian-Democratic Rebirth Party, also known as the Christian Democratic Movement of Armenia, is a Christian democratic political party in Armenia, founded on 15 September 2018.

History 
The party was founded during a ceremony held in Yerevan on 15 September 2018.

The party did participate in the 2018 Armenian parliamentary election, however the party received just 0.51% of the popular vote and failed to gain any political representation in the National Assembly. The party had nominated 82 candidates to run in the election across the country, including some members from the Hayk Party.

Following the election results, the party pledged to support the elected government of Nikol Pashinyan but that it would also act as an extra-parliamentary force to ensure that democratic principals are upheld in the country.

In May 2021, the party formed an electoral alliance with the For The Republic Party. The alliance, known as the Shirinyan-Babajanyan Alliance of Democrats, announced its intentions to participate in the 2021 Armenian parliamentary elections with Arman Babajanyan as its leader. Following the election, the alliance received 1.50% of the popular vote, failing to win any seats in the National Assembly.

Ideology 
The party supported the developments of the 2018 Armenian revolution and aimed to strengthen the results of the revolution by establishing a  new political party, based on Christian morals and democratic values. During a press statement, Levon Shirinyan stated, "We want to develop the cultural values of the country and revive the Armenian high culture."

The parties chairman also stated that the principal ideology will be a combination of both socialism and conservatism, while strongly opposing liberalism. Shirinyan stated, "In the 1990s, we had communistic extremism and now we have liberalism. Both are dangerous, both direct to nowhere."

In terms of economics, the party advocates for a strong social market economy and a revival of the industrial sector.

In regards to foreign policy, the party does not wish to align completely with either Russia or the West. The party is opposed to the Russification of Armenia. Rather, party leaders advocate towards maintaining neutrality and developing a mutually beneficial relationship with Russia.

Electoral record

Parliamentary elections

See also

 Programs of political parties in Armenia
 Politics of Armenia

References

External links 
 Christian-Democratic Rebirth Party on Facebook

Political parties established in 2018
Political parties in Armenia
Christian democratic parties in Europe